Irakli Machkhaneli (born 18 June 1981) is a retired Georgian rugby union player who played as a wing.

He played in France for AS Béziers (2005/06-2006/07), Stade Montois (2007/08), SU Agen (2008/09), CA Saint-Étienne (2009/10), in the Pro D2, Mâcon (2010/11) and once again CA Saint-Étienne (2011/12-2012/13), in the Fédérale 1. He moved back to Georgia, where he played for RC Armazi Tbilisi, in Georgia Championship, since 2013/14. It was with Armazi Tbilisi that he started is rugby union career, where he was noticed by the Georgian coach and was selected for the 2001–02 European Nations Cup First Division. He made his debut on 3 February 2002 against the Netherlands.

He has 73 caps for Georgia since 2002, with 23 tries scored, 115 points on aggregate. He is one of the two top tries scorers for the "Lelos". He was called for the 2003 Rugby World Cup, where he played in all the four games, the 2007 Rugby World Cup, playing in three games and scoring a try, and the 2011 Rugby World Cup, playing in two games. He is the current captain for the "Lelos".

In 2014 he retired, with his last cap coming against Tonga on 8 November 2014. Since then he has been assistant coach for the team, specializing with the backs.

References

External links

1981 births
Living people
Rugby union players from Tbilisi
Rugby union players from Georgia (country)
Rugby union wings
Georgia international rugby union players